Sanou is a surname of Burkinabé origin. People with this surname include:

Aliassou Sanou (born 1988), Burkinabé footballer
Bernadette Sanou Dao (born 1952), Burkinabé author and politician
Dieudonné Sanou, Burkinabé footballer
Firmin Sanou (born 1973), Burkinabé footballer
Germain Sanou (born 1992), Burkinabé footballer
Gervais Sanou (born 1985), Burkinabé footballer
Idrissa Sanou (born 1977), Burkinabé athlete
Issouf Sanou (born 1979), Burkinabé footballer
Lazare Sanou, Burkinabé footballer
Mathurin Sanou, Burkinabé footballer
Ousmane Sanou (born 1978), Burkinabé footballer
Roland Sanou (born 1983), Burkinabé footballer
Salif Sanou, Burkinabé footballer
Sibiri Sanou (born 1998), Burkinabé footballer
Valéry Sanou (born 1989), Burkinabé footballer
Wilfried Sanou (born 1984), Burkinabé footballer
Worokia Sanou (born 1989), Burkinabé athlete
Yaya Sanou (born 1993), Burkinabé footballer
Youssouf Sanou (born 1987), Burkinabé footballer
Surnames of Burkinabé origin